Brady W. Walker (March 15, 1921 – November 30, 2007) was an American professional basketball player. Walker was selected in the 1948 BAA Draft by the Providence Steamrollers after a collegiate career at Brigham Young. He played for the Steamrollers, Boston Celtics, and Baltimore Bullets in his four-year BAA/NBA career.

BAA/NBA career statistics

Regular season

References

External links
 BYU profile

1921 births
2007 deaths
American men's basketball players
Baltimore Bullets (1944–1954) players
Basketball players from Utah
Boston Celtics players
BYU Cougars men's basketball players
BYU Cougars men's track and field athletes
Centers (basketball)
Forwards (basketball)
Providence Steamrollers draft picks
Providence Steamrollers players
Sportspeople from Provo, Utah